Prairieton Township is one of twelve townships in Vigo County, Indiana, United States. As of the 2010 census, its population was 1,222 and it contained 517 housing units.

Geography

Cities, towns, villages
 Terre Haute (west edge)

Unincorporated communities
 Prairieton

Adjacent townships
 Sugar Creek Township (north)
 Honey Creek Township (east)
 Linton Township (southeast)
 Prairie Creek Township (southwest)
 Darwin Township, Clark County, Illinois (west)
 Wabash Township, Clark County, Illinois (northwest)

Cemeteries
The township contains New Harmony Cemetery.

Airports and landing strips
 Higginbotham Field

Landmarks
 Federal Bureau of Prisons Terre Haute Penitentiary (west edge)

School districts
 Vigo County School Corporation

Political districts
 Indiana's 8th congressional district
 State House District 45
 State Senate District 39

Municipal
 Praireton/Prairie Creek Fire Protection District
 The Fire Departments from Prairieton Township and Prairie Creek Township merged to form a Fire Protection District on August 16, 2007.

References
 United States Census Bureau 2007 TIGER/Line Shapefiles
 United States Board on Geographic Names (GNIS)
 IndianaMap

External links

Townships in Vigo County, Indiana
Terre Haute metropolitan area
Townships in Indiana